Diplodactylus capensis, sometimes called the Cape Range stone gecko, is a gecko endemic to Australia.

References

Diplodactylus
Reptiles described in 2008
Taxa named by Paul Doughty
Taxa named by Paul M. Oliver
Taxa named by Mark Adams (herpetologist)
Geckos of Australia